Transforming growth factor, beta-induced, 68kDa, also known as TGFBI (initially called BIGH3, BIG-H3), is a protein which in humans is encoded by the TGFBI gene, locus 5q31.

Function 

This gene encodes an RGD-containing protein that binds to type I, II and IV collagens. The RGD motif is found in many extracellular matrix proteins modulating cell adhesion and serves as a ligand recognition sequence for several integrins. This protein plays a role in cell-collagen interactions and may be involved in endochondrial bone formation in cartilage. The protein is induced by transforming growth factor-beta and acts to inhibit cell adhesion.

Clinical significance 
Mutations of the gene cause several forms of corneal dystrophies.

References

Further reading

Extracellular matrix proteins